Housing and Community Development Act, the name of several United States federal laws, may refer to:

Housing and Community Development Act of 1974
Housing and Community Development Act of 1977
Housing and Community Development Act of 1980
Housing and Community Development Act of 1987
Housing and Community Development Act of 1992

See also
Community Reinvestment Act